Niarchos may refer to:

Philip Niarchos (born 1954), eldest son of the Greek shipping magnate Stavros Niarchos
Spyros Niarchos (born 1955), second son of the Greek shipping magnate Stavros Niarchos
Stavros Niarchos (1909–1996), Greek shipping tycoon
Stavros Niarchos Foundation, established in 1996 to honor Greek shipping magnate Stavros Niarchos
Stavros S Niarchos (ship), British brig-rigged tall ship owned and operated by the Tall Ships Youth Trust
Victoria Niarchos (born 1960), member of the non-aristocratic branch of the Guinness beer clan
Niarchos, a genus of goblin spiders